Rajasthan Perfect FC (formerly as AU Rajasthan Football Club), is an Indian professional football club based in Jaipur, Rajasthan, that competes in the R-League A Division, and previously participated in the I-League 2nd Division. Founded in 2018, the club first competed professionally when they were part of the 2019–20 season of I-League 2nd Division, the second tier of Indian football league system.

History
AU Rajasthan FC is the first premier professional football club and academy based out of Jaipur. The club was founded in the year of 2018 and comes under the banner of Spordy Ventures Private Limited. In its first year of inception, the club has managed to qualify for the Hero Youth leagues and also win the first-ever Rajasthan Women's League.
The club aims to provide a pathway of progressive growth from the grassroots level to competing at the highest professional level.

The club is in collaboration with Palamós CF, one of the oldest clubs in Spain, founded in 1898, and its academy Perfect Football is the technical partner of AU Rajasthan FC. The club plans to train players with use of global training methodology in partnership with Perfect Football.
AU Rajasthan is the first club from Rajasthan to play in I-League 2nd Division.
Rajasthan FC organised Christmas Cup 2020 in Purnima University and Heritage Cup in February 2021, which was won by ARA FC.

AU Rajasthan participated in the inaugural Rajasthan State Men's League 2019 and finished as runners-up with 15 points from 7 matches, behind champion Rajasthan United.

AU Rajasthan FC has launched a premier football residential academy in Jaipur, in collaboration with Poornima University. The club handpicked players from all the major cities of India through trials.

Rajasthan FC rebranded themselves as Rajasthan Perfect FC ahead of R-League A Division 2021.

Stadiums
 
AU Rajasthan used the Maharaja Umaid Singh Stadium in Jodhpur as their home stadium for I-League 2nd Division of 2019–20 season matches. They played at the University Sports Complex during the inaugural season of R-League A Division.

Kit manufacturers and shirt sponsors

Personnel

Players

2022 squad

Team record

Key
Tms. = Number of teams
Pos. = Position in league
Attendance/G = Average league attendance

Head coaching record
updated on 20 July 2020

Affiliated clubs
The following clubs are currently affiliated with AU Rajasthan FC:
 Palamós CF (2018–present)

References

External links 

Rajasthan Perfect FC at the-aiff.com

AU Rajasthan FC
Football clubs in Rajasthan
I-League 2nd Division clubs
Association football clubs established in 2018
2018 establishments in Rajasthan